Røros Station is a railway station located in the town of Røros in the municipality of Røros in Trøndelag county, Norway. It is located along the Rørosbanen railway line. Service to the station is provided though regional trains operated by SJ Norge to Trondheim and Hamar. The station was opened in 1877, the same time that the Røros Line opened. The station restaurant was taken over by Norsk Spisevognselskap on 1 December 1944.

References

Røros
Railway stations in Trøndelag
Railway stations on the Røros Line
Railway stations opened in 1877
1877 establishments in Norway